Stephanie Jones may refer to:
Stephanie J. Jones, American lawyer
Stephanie Tubbs Jones (1949–2008), American politician
Stephanie Jones (basketball), American professional basketball player
Steffi Jones (born 1972), German football player and manager